This is intended to be a complete list of properties and districts listed on the National Register of Historic Places that are located in the Houston Heights neighborhood of Houston.  The "Houston Heights" neighborhood borders are, approximately, Interstate 10 on the South, I-610 on the North, Interstate 45 on the East and Durham on the West.

The locations of National Register properties and districts (at least for all showing latitude and longitude coordinates below) may be seen in a map by clicking on "Map of all coordinates."

Current listings
 

|}

Former listings

|}

References

External links
 University of Houston Digital Library: vintage photo of the Houston Cotton Exchange Building in the early 20th−century

Houston Heights, Houston, Harris County
National Register of Historic Places in Houston
Houston Heights